The Democratic Gay/ Lesbian Party - The People's Party (German: Demokratische Schwul / Lesbische Partei - Die Bürgerpartei) short-form: DSLP was a minor pro-LGBT political party in Germany. It was founded by former self-proclaimed NPD-sympathizer Thomas Mosmann.

Program 
The 2013 party program reportedly advocated for the reintroduction of border controls, assimilation of immigrants, a crackdown on drug possession as well as crime, and the deportation of criminal foreigners. In the same program, the DSLP also advocated for animal rights, a universal basic income, the recognition of same-sex marriage, LGBT anti-discrimination legislation, and a stop to all reparations payments for World War 2.

The DSLP adopted a new party program in 2014 which removed all nationalist sentiments and laid a bigger focus on equality, after the adoption of which Thomas Mosmann stepped down from all offices in the party.

Weblinks 

 Facebook page of the DSLP
 Queer.de article on the DSLP

References 

2013 establishments
2013 establishments in Germany
German nationalist political parties
Nationalist parties in Germany
LGBT political parties
Political parties supporting universal basic income
2016 disestablishments in Germany
Defunct LGBT organizations
Defunct political parties in Germany
LGBT conservatism